Lionel Powers may refer to:

Gabriel Byrne's character in Weapons of Mass Distraction
Leonel Power, early 15th-century composer